The Province of Rovigo (Provincia di Rovigo) is a province in the Veneto region of Italy. Its capital is the city of Rovigo.
It borders on the north with the provinces of Verona, Padua and Venice, on the south with the province of Ferrara, on the west with the province of Mantua, and on the east 
with the Adriatic Sea.

Geography and demographics 
The province of Rovigo corresponds with or is full included into contemporary Polesine.

The northern border is set on the Adige river from Badia Polesine to the sea, except for the territory of Cavarzere (in the province of Venice); the southern border is set on the Po river from Melara to the sea.
The province includes the whole delta of the Po and the border is set on the Po di Goro channel of the delta.

The rivers Po and Adige have had a stable course only in recent times.
The land is of relatively recent formation, created by drifts taken by the rivers, and subsidence occurs due to natural consolidation as well as to human activities such as drainage, groundwater extraction and methane extraction.

The Canal Bianco is the only other river that flows across the province.
Many canals for drainage have been dug in the province of Rovigo because the Po and the Adige are the first and the third biggest rivers of Italy as for rate of flow and the land has a huge amount of water to deal with; the main canals are the Collettore Padano, the Ceresolo and the Valdentro.

Other streams of historic importance are the Adigetto (a former course of the Adige), the Poazzo (a former course of the Po) and the Fossa Polesella (a former waterway connecting the Canal Bianco with the Po).

The climate is mild continental with high humidity, having sultry summers and foggy winters; precipitation is normal, usually happens in spring and autumn.

There are 50 comuni (singular: comune) in the province . As of 2011, the main comuni by population are:

The province of Rovigo suffers the emigration phenomenon even nowadays: young people still use to emigrate to more developed areas of Veneto and of Italy; this leads to population ageing. There are still migrations from rural areas to more developed towns within the boundaries of the province.

The SS434 "Transpolesana", a long highway, connects Verona with Rovigo and crosses the western part of the province. A13 toll motorway, connecting Bologna with Padua, A31, connecting Badia Polesine and SS434 Transpolesana with Piovene Rocchette, and SS309 "Romea" State Road, connecting Venice with Ravenna, pass through the zone. The A13 motorway exits in the province of Rovigo are Occhiobello, Villamarzana-Rovigo sud and Rovigo, while the only A31 exits in the province are Badia Polesine and the final junction with SS434.

History 

The territory of the province was first colonized by the Greeks, who founded the colony of Adria in the 12th-11th centuries BC. During the 6th and 5th centuries BC Etruscans and Venetians inhabited the area, followed by the Romans.

In the Middle Ages the region was ruled by the Este as part of the Duchy of Ferrara, but Rovigo was not an administrative unit of the duchy, and there was more than one Podesteria for each side of the Po river.

After the War of Ferrara in 1484 the Republic of Venice started ruling over the northern part of Polesine; the Venetians designated it a territorio whose capital was Rovigo, thus giving the area an administrative unity for the first time. This can be viewed as the start of the province of Rovigo, though its extent was a less than today; the borders were set as the Canal Bianco river with few exceptions: the territories of Polesella, Guarda Veneta, Adria and the delta of the Po were included in the Venetian territorio of Rovigo.

After the Congress of Vienna in 1815 all the territories to the north of the Po were included into the Kingdom of Lombardy–Venetia, thus giving the province its modern extent.

Economy 
The province is characterized by a thriving agriculture, particularly the cultivation of wheat, maize, rice and sugar beets as well as grapevines, apples, pears, peaches, tomatoes and vegetables.

There are small to medium size factories set in the city of Rovigo and few other centres of the province: they mainly are about food processing (many are sugar refineries), metalworking, carpentry, textile, construction and construction materials.
Many Aquaculture farms are set in the wetlands of the delta of the Po.

The province of Rovigo has some famous holiday villages, as Rosolina Mare, Rosa Pineta, and Albarella Island (Isola di Albarella in Italian).

Delta and nature delta park 
The eastern portion of the province corresponds with the delta of River Po, a large area where the river subdivides into channels (each with its own name). The delta is also a protected area, because it's a national-legally recognized nature park.

See also
Bishopric of Adria for ecclesiastical matters

References

External links
 Provincia di Rovigo homepage  

 
Rovigo